Ferdows County is in South Khorasan province, Iran. The capital of the county is the city of Ferdows. At the 2006 census, the county's population was 61,346 in 17,539 households. The following census in 2011 counted 41,626 people in 12,440 households, by which time Boshruyeh District had been separated from the county to form Boshruyeh County. At the 2016 census, the county's population was 45,523 in 14,302 households.

Situated in the north of the province, Ferdows County, which was formed in 1944, originally included a large area (more than 78,000 km2), but its subdivisions have gradually become independent and now encompasses four counties (Ferdows, Tabas, Sarayan and Boshruyeh counties). After dividing the former Khorasan province into three provinces, Ferdows County was initially a part of Razavi Khorasan province, but was incorporated within the borders of South Khorasan province in March 2007.

Ferdows County borders Gonabad County and Bajestan County to the north, Gonabad County and Sarayan County to the east, Boshruyeh County to the west and south, and Tabas County to the south.

Ferdows is famous for its high quality saffron and pomegranate.

Administrative divisions

The population history and structural changes of Ferdows County's administrative divisions over three consecutive censuses are shown in the following table. The latest census shows one district, three rural districts, and two cities.

Visitor attractions 
 Ferdows Hot Mineral Spring
 Ferdows Hole-in-the-Rock
 Polond Desert
 Ferdows Religious School (dating to Safavid dynasty)
 Ferdows Congregation Mosque (Jame' Mosque of Ferdows) (dating to Seljuk dynasty)

References

 

Counties of South Khorasan Province